Kelly Park may refer to:

Parks
Albert Kelly Park, a park in southwest Portland, Oregon, USA
Dr. Howard A. Kelly Park, a park in Orange County, Florida, USA
Edward J. Kelly Park, a park located in Washington, D.C., USA
J.J. Kelly Park, a park in Wollongong, a city in New South Wales, Australia
Kelley Point Park, a city park in north Portland, Oregon, USA
Kelly Butte Natural Area, a city park in southeast Portland, Oregon, USA
Kelly Ingram Park, a park in Birmingham, Alabama, USA
Kelly Park, a community park in Indianapolis, Indiana, USA
Kelly Park, a park in Brooklyn, New York City, USA
Kelly Park (Compton), a park in Compton, California

People
Kelly Coffield Park, an American actress and comedian

See also
Kelly Hill (disambiguation)